The enzyme mannonate dehydratase catalyzes the chemical reaction

D-mannonate  2-dehydro-3-deoxy-D-gluconate + H2O

This enzyme belongs to the family of lyases, specifically the hydro-lyases, which cleave carbon-oxygen bonds.  The systematic name of this enzyme class is D-mannonate hydro-lyase (2-dehydro-3-deoxy-D-gluconate-forming). Other names in common use include mannonic hydrolase, mannonate hydrolyase, altronic hydro-lyase, altronate hydrolase, D-mannonate hydrolyase, and D-mannonate hydro-lyase.  This enzyme participates in pentose and glucuronate interconversions.

Structural studies

As of late 2007, only one structure has been solved for this class of enzymes, with the PDB accession code .

References

 
 

EC 4.2.1
Enzymes of known structure